is a former Japanese football player.

Playing career
Tanaka was born in Ritto on January 6, 1983. After graduating from high school, he joined J1 League club Shimizu S-Pulse in 2001. However he could not play at all in the match until 2003. In 2004, he moved to Japan Football League (JFL) club Otsuka Pharmaceutical (later Tokushima Vortis). He played many matches as regular player and the club won the champions in 2004 and was promoted to J2 League from 2005. However he could not play many matches in 2005. In 2006, he moved to Regional Leagues club FC Gifu. The club was promoted to JFL from 2007. However he could not play many matches. In 2008, he moved to JFL club MIO Biwako Kusatsu based in his local. He played many matches until 2009. However he could not play many matches in 2010 and retired end of 2010 season.

Club statistics

References

External links

1983 births
Living people
Association football people from Shiga Prefecture
Japanese footballers
J1 League players
J2 League players
Japan Football League players
Shimizu S-Pulse players
Tokushima Vortis players
FC Gifu players
MIO Biwako Shiga players
Association football midfielders